Paul Ourselin (born 13 April 1994) is a French cyclist, who currently rides for UCI ProTeam .

Biography
Born in Saint-Pierre-sur-Dives, Ourselin started cycling at the age of seven, in the French "Poussin" category, which is reserved for youths between the ages of 7 and 8 years old. Later on, he moved to Caen before leaving Normandy for Vendée, having obtained his high school diploma in 2012. He continued his studies with a 2-year diploma in sales application. During this time, he shared an apartment with Justin Mottier, while also getting to know Pierre-Henri Lecuisinier and Lorrenzo Manzin, who became racing cyclists for the  team.

In July 2019, he was named in the startlist for the 2019 Tour de France. In October 2020, he was named in the startlist for the 2020 Vuelta a España.

Major results
2013
 3rd Grand Prix cycliste de Machecou
2015
 1st Overall Circuit du Mené
2016
 1st  Road race, National Under–23 Road Championships
 1st Paris–Mantes-en-Yvelines
2019
 7th Polynormande
2022
 4th Boucles de l'Aulne
2023
 6th Overall La Tropicale Amissa Bongo

Grand Tour general classification results timeline

References

External links

1994 births
Living people
French male cyclists
Sportspeople from Calvados (department)
Cyclists from Normandy